Yulee Sugar Mill Ruins Historic State Park is a Florida State Park located in Homosassa, off U.S. 19. It contains the ruins of a forced-labor farm owned by David Levy Yulee. Yulee was an enslaver and a delegate of the Florida Territorial Legislative Council. After Florida became a state, he was elected by the legislature in 1845 to the United States Senate, becoming the first American of Jewish heritage to serve there. After Florida seceded from the Union, Yulee served in the Confederate Congress.  He is credited with having developed a network of railroads that tremendously boosted the state's economy.

At Homosassa, Yulee established a farm of some  worked by about 1,000 enslaved African Americans. They raised sugarcane, citrus, and cotton. The large mill (which was steam-driven) ran from 1851 to 1864. It produced sugar, syrup and molasses, the latter used in making rum. The farm supplied confederate soldiers with sugar products and was largely destroyed during the American Civil War.

At the park, the stonework (foundation, well and 40-foot chimney) of the mill, iron gears, a cane press, and some of the other machinery remain. The site was added to the National Register of Historic Places on August 12, 1970.

References

External links
 Yulee Sugar Mill Ruins Historic State Park at Florida State Parks

Archaeological sites in Florida
Jews and Judaism in Florida
Parks in Citrus County, Florida
State parks of Florida
Ruins in the United States
History of sugar
Protected areas established in 1970
Agricultural buildings and structures on the National Register of Historic Places in Florida
Industrial buildings completed in 1851
Sugar plantations in Florida
Sugar refineries
Agriculture in Florida
1851 establishments in Florida
Cotton plantations in Florida
National Register of Historic Places in Citrus County, Florida
1970 establishments in Florida